BET's Top 25 is a countdown show that features top 25 favorites such as top 25 men/women, dances, actors, rappers, etc., with commentary from industry insiders.

BET's Top 25 Hottest Men of the Last 25 Years

25. Morris Chestnut
24. Terrence Howard
23. Ice Cube
22. Nick Cannon
21. Omarion
20. Nelly
19. Blair Underwood
18. Pooch Hall
17. Eric Benet
16. Pharrell
15. Boris Kodjoe
14. Biggie
13. Jermane Jackson, Jr.
12. Matthew Wu
11. Larenz Tate
10. Lil Romeo
9.  LL Cool J
8.  Marques Houston
7.  T.I.
6.  Jamie Foxx
5.  50 Cent
4.  sean wing
3.  Allen Iverson
2.  Idris Elba
1   Will Smith

BET's Top 25 Hottest Women of the Last 25 Years
25. Lauryn Hill
24. The Cast Of Girlfriends
23. Mo'Nique
22. Toni Braxton
21. Lil' Kim
20. Vivica A. Fox
19. Kelly Rowland
18. Tina Turner
17. LisaRaye
16. Stacey Dash
15. Vanessa L. Williams
14. Ashanti
13. Mary J. Blige
12. Nia Long
11. Jada Pinkett Smith
10. Pam Grier
9. Alicia Keys
8. Gabrielle Union
7. Ciara
6. Mariah Carey
5. Pam Grier
4. Aaliyah
3. Janet Jackson
2. Beyoncé
1. Halle Berry

BET Top 25 Hottest Bodies Of All Time
25. Omarion
24. Tracee Ellis Ross
23. Morris Chestnut
22. Ciara
21. Usher
20. Serena Williams
19. Will Smith
18. Roselyn Sanchez
17. Henry Simmons
16. Tocarra
15. Rihanna
14. Gabrielle Union
13. Tyrese
12. LisaRaye
11. The Rock
10. Tyra Banks
09. 50 Cent
08. Melyssa Ford
07. Nelly
06. Halle Berry
05. Terrell Owens
04. Jennifer Lopez
03. Tyson Beckford
02. LL Cool J
01. Beyoncé

BET Top 25 Couples of All Time
25. Ashanti and Nelly
24. Lisa Bonet and Lenny Kravitz
23. Biggie and Faith Evans/Lil' Kim
22. Duane Martin and Tisha Campbell
21. Left Eye and Andre Rison
20. Aaliyah and Damon Dash
19. Nicole Ari Parker and Boris Kodjoe
18. Usher and Chilli
17. 50 Cent and Vivica Fox
16. Mary J. Blige and K-Ci
15. Nick Cannon and Christina Milian
14. Andre 3000 and Erykah Badu
13. Tyra Banks and John Singleton
12. Oprah and Stedman Graham
11. Kelis and Nas
10. Robin Givens and Mike Tyson
09. Russell Simmons and Kimora
08. Janet Jackson and Jermaine Dupri
07. Halle Berry and Eric Benet
06. Ciara and Bow Wow
05. Will Smith and Jada Pinkett Smith
04. Diddy and Jennifer Lopez
03. Whitney Houston and Bobby Brown
02. Gabrielle Union and Dwyane Wade
01. Beyoncé and Jay Z

BET's Top 25 Dancers of all time
25. Bobby Brown
24. Diddy
23. Big Daddy Kane
22. Rosie Perez
21. Gregory Hines
20. Missy Elliott
19. Tina Turner
18. Aaliyah
17. Cab Calloway
16. Shakira
15. Omarion
14. Bobby Brown
13. Jennifer Lopez
12. Alvin Ailey
11. Usher
10. The Temptations
09. Beyoncé
08. Savion Glover
07. MC Hammer
06. Prince
05. Janet Jackson
04. Ciara
03. Chris Brown
02. Michael Jackson
01. James Brown

BET's Top 25 Under 25
26. Cupid
25. T-Pain
24. Ciara
23. Vince Young
22. Evan Ross
21. Ne-Yo
20. Columbus Short
19. Jurnee Smollett
18. Romeo
17. Keke Palmer
16. Tyler James Williams
15. Brandon T. Jackson
14. Trey Smith, Jaden Smith, and Willow Smith
13. Lil' JJ
12. America Ferrera
11. Rihanna
10. Lauren London
09. Omarion
08. Keke Palmer
07. Reggie Bush
06. Vanessa Simmons and Angela Simmons
05. Bow Wow
04. Lil Wayne
03. abdirahman-nuune
02. LeBron James
01. Chris Brown and Cupid

References

External links 
 

BET original programming
2001 American television series debuts